Annie Courtney is an Irish former Social Democratic and Labour Party (SDLP) politician who was a Member of the Northern Ireland Assembly (MLA) for Foyle from 2000 to 2003.

Career 
Courtney became a nurse in Derry.
Courtney joined the Social Democratic and Labour Party (SDLP), was elected to Derry City Council in 1985, and served as Mayor of Derry in 1993.  Courtney retired from nursing in 1997.

When SDLP leader John Hume resigned from the Northern Ireland Assembly, effective from December 2000, Courtney was co-opted as his replacement, representing Foyle.  Courtney was keen to contest the 2003 Northern Ireland Assembly election for the party, but did not gain the SDLP's nomination.  As a result, she resigned from the party in April 2003 and instead sat as an independent.  Courtney stood as an independent in the election, but took only 802 votes and was not elected.

References

Year of birth missing (living people)
Place of birth missing (living people)
Living people
Social Democratic and Labour Party MLAs
Northern Ireland MLAs 1998–2003
Independent politicians in Northern Ireland
Female members of the Northern Ireland Assembly
Women mayors of places in Northern Ireland
Politicians from Derry (city)
Mayors of Derry
20th-century women politicians from Northern Ireland